The Louisiana Purchase was the acquisition of the territory of Louisiana by the United States from the French First Republic in 1803. However, France only controlled a small fraction of this area, most of which was inhabited by Native Americans; effectively, for the majority of the area, the United States bought the "preemptive" right to obtain "Indian" lands by treaty or by conquest, to the exclusion of other colonial powers.

The Kingdom of France had controlled the Louisiana territory from 1699 until it was ceded to Spain in 1762. In 1800, Napoleon, the First Consul of the French Republic, regained ownership of Louisiana as part of a broader effort to re-establish a French colonial empire in North America. However, France's failure to suppress a revolt in Saint-Domingue, coupled with the prospect of renewed warfare with the United Kingdom, prompted Napoleon to consider selling Louisiana to the United States. Acquisition of Louisiana was a long-term goal of President Thomas Jefferson, who was especially eager to gain control of the crucial Mississippi River port of New Orleans. Jefferson tasked James Monroe and Robert R. Livingston with purchasing New Orleans. Negotiating with French Treasury Minister François Barbé-Marbois, the American representatives quickly agreed to purchase the entire territory of Louisiana after it was offered. Overcoming the opposition of the Federalist Party, Jefferson and Secretary of State James Madison persuaded Congress to ratify and fund the Louisiana Purchase.

The Louisiana Purchase extended United States sovereignty across the Mississippi River, nearly doubling the nominal size of the country. The purchase included land from fifteen present U.S. states and two Canadian provinces, including the entirety of Arkansas, Missouri, Iowa, Oklahoma, Kansas, and Nebraska; large portions of North Dakota and South Dakota; the area of Montana, Wyoming, and Colorado east of the Continental Divide; the portion of Minnesota west of the Mississippi River; the northeastern section of New Mexico; northern portions of Texas; New Orleans and the portions of the present state of Louisiana west of the Mississippi River; and small portions of land within Alberta and Saskatchewan. At the time of the purchase, the territory of Louisiana's non-native population was around 60,000 inhabitants, of whom half were enslaved Africans. The western borders of the purchase were later settled by the 1819 Adams–Onís Treaty with Spain, while the northern borders of the purchase were adjusted by the Treaty of 1818 with Britain.

Background

Throughout the second half of the 18th century, the French colony of Louisiana became a pawn for European political intrigue. The colony was the most substantial presence of France's overseas empire, with other possessions consisting of a few small settlements along the Mississippi and other main rivers. France ceded the territory to Spain in 1762 in the secret Treaty of Fontainebleau. Following French defeat in the Seven Years' War, Spain gained control of the territory west of the Mississippi, and the British received the territory to the east of the river.

Following the establishment of the United States, the Americans controlled the area east of the Mississippi and north of New Orleans. The main issue for the Americans was free transit of the Mississippi out to sea. As the lands were being gradually settled by American migrants, many Americans, including Jefferson, assumed that the territory would be acquired "piece by piece." The risk of another power taking it from a weakened Spain made a "profound reconsideration" of this policy necessary. New Orleans was already important for shipping agricultural goods to and from the areas of the United States west of the Appalachian Mountains. Pinckney's Treaty, signed with Spain on October 27, 1795, gave American merchants "right of deposit" in New Orleans, granting them use of the port to store goods for export. The treaty also recognized American rights to navigate the entire Mississippi, which had become vital to the growing trade of the western territories.

In 1798, Spain revoked the treaty allowing American use of New Orleans, greatly upsetting Americans. In 1801, Spanish Governor Don Juan Manuel de Salcedo took over from the Marquess of Casa Calvo, and restored the American right to deposit goods. However, in 1800 Spain had ceded the Louisiana territory back to France as part of Napoleon's secret Third Treaty of San Ildefonso. The territory nominally remained under Spanish control, until a transfer of power to France on November 30, 1803, just three weeks before the formal cession of the territory to the United States on December 20, 1803.

Negotiation

While the transfer of the territory by Spain back to France in 1800 went largely unnoticed, fear of an eventual French invasion spread across America when, in 1801, Napoleon sent a military force to secure New Orleans. Though Jefferson urged moderation, Federalists sought to use this against Jefferson and called for hostilities against France. Undercutting them, Jefferson threatened an alliance with Britain, although relations were uneasy in that direction. In 1801, Jefferson supported France in its plan to take back Saint-Domingue (present-day Haiti), which was then under control of Toussaint Louverture after a slave rebellion. Jefferson sent Livingston to Paris in 1801 with the authorization to purchase New Orleans.

In January 1802, France sent General Charles Leclerc on an expedition to Saint-Domingue to reassert French control over a colony that had become essentially autonomous under Louverture. Louverture, as a French general, had fended off incursions from other European powers, but had also begun to consolidate power for himself on the island. Before the revolution, France had derived enormous wealth from St. Domingue at the cost of the lives and freedom of the slaves. Napoleon wanted its revenues and productivity for France restored. Alarmed over the French actions and its intention to re-establish an empire in North America, Jefferson declared neutrality in relation to the Caribbean, refusing credit and other assistance to the French, but allowing war contraband to get through to the rebels to prevent France from regaining a foothold.

In 1803, Pierre Samuel du Pont de Nemours, a French nobleman, began to help negotiate with France at the request of Jefferson. Du Pont was living in the United States at the time and had close ties to Jefferson as well as the prominent politicians in France. He engaged in back-channel diplomacy with Napoleon on Jefferson's behalf during a visit to France and originated the idea of the much larger Louisiana Purchase as a way to defuse potential conflict between the United States and Napoleon over North America.

Throughout this time, Jefferson had up-to-date intelligence on Napoleon's military activities and intentions in North America. Part of his evolving strategy involved giving du Pont some information that was withheld from Livingston. Desperate to avoid possible war with France, Jefferson sent James Monroe to Paris in 1803 to negotiate a settlement, with instructions to go to London to negotiate an alliance if the talks in Paris failed. Spain procrastinated until late 1802 in executing the treaty to transfer Louisiana to France, which allowed American hostility to build. Also, Spain's refusal to cede Florida to France meant that Louisiana would be indefensible.

Napoleon needed peace with Britain to take possession of Louisiana. Otherwise, Louisiana would be an easy prey for a potential invasion from Britain or the U.S. But in early 1803, continuing war between France and Britain seemed unavoidable. On March 11, 1803, Napoleon began preparing to invade Great Britain.

In Saint-Domingue, Leclerc's forces took Louverture prisoner, but their expedition soon faltered in the face of fierce resistance and disease. By early 1803, Napoleon decided to abandon his plans to rebuild France's New World empire. Without sufficient revenues from sugar colonies in the Caribbean, Louisiana had little value to him. Spain had not yet completed the transfer of Louisiana to France, and war between France and the UK was imminent. Out of anger towards Spain and the unique opportunity to sell something that was useless and not truly his yet, Napoleon decided to sell the entire territory.

Although the foreign minister Talleyrand opposed the plan, on April 10, 1803, Napoleon told the Treasury Minister François Barbé-Marbois that he was considering selling the entire Louisiana Territory to the United States. On April 11, 1803, just days before Monroe's arrival, Barbé-Marbois offered Livingston all of Louisiana for $15 million, which averages to less than three cents per acre (7¢/ha). The total of $15 million is equivalent to about $ million in  dollars, or  cents per acre. The American representatives were prepared to pay up to $10 million for New Orleans and its environs but were dumbfounded when the vastly larger territory was offered for $15 million. Jefferson had authorized Livingston only to purchase New Orleans. However, Livingston was certain that the United States would accept the offer.

The Americans thought that Napoleon might withdraw the offer at any time, preventing the United States from acquiring New Orleans, so they agreed and signed the Louisiana Purchase Treaty on April 30, 1803, (10 Floréal XI in the French Republican calendar) at the Hôtel Tubeuf in Paris. The signers were Robert Livingston, James Monroe, and François Barbé-Marbois. After the signing Livingston famously stated, "We have lived long, but this is the noblest work of our whole lives... From this day the United States take their place among the powers of the first rank." On July 4, 1803, the treaty was announced, but the documents did not arrive in Washington, D.C. until July 14. The Louisiana Territory was vast, stretching from the Gulf of Mexico in the south to Rupert's Land in the north, and from the Mississippi River in the east to the Rocky Mountains in the west. Acquiring the territory doubled the size of the United States.

In November 1803, France withdrew its 7,000 surviving troops from Saint-Domingue (more than two-thirds of its troops died there) and gave up its ambitions in the Western Hemisphere. In 1804 Haiti declared its independence; but fearing a slave revolt at home, Jefferson and the rest of Congress refused to recognize the new republic, the second in the Western Hemisphere, and imposed a trade embargo against it. This, together with the successful French demand for an indemnity of 150 million francs in 1825, severely hampered Haiti's ability to repair its economy after decades of war.

Domestic opposition and constitutionality

After Monroe and Livingston had returned from France with news of the purchase, an official announcement of the purchase was made on July 4, 1803. This gave Jefferson and his cabinet until October, when the treaty had to be ratified, to discuss the constitutionality of the purchase. Jefferson considered a constitutional amendment to justify the purchase; however, his cabinet convinced him otherwise. Jefferson justified the purchase by rationalizing, "it is the case of a guardian, investing the money of his ward in purchasing an important adjacent territory; & saying to him when of age, I did this for your good." Jefferson ultimately came to the conclusion before the ratification of the treaty that the purchase was to protect the citizens of the United States therefore making it constitutional.

Henry Adams and other historians have argued that Jefferson acted hypocritically with the Louisiana Purchase, because of his position as a strict constructionist regarding the Constitution since he stretched the intent of that document to justify his purchase. The American purchase of the Louisiana territory was not accomplished without domestic opposition. Jefferson's philosophical consistency was in question because of his strict interpretation of the Constitution. Many people believed that he and others, including James Madison, were doing something they surely would have argued against with Alexander Hamilton. The Federalists strongly opposed the purchase, favoring close relations with Britain over closer ties to Napoleon.

Both Federalists and Jeffersonians were concerned over the purchase's constitutionality. Many members of the House of Representatives opposed the purchase. Majority Leader John Randolph led the opposition. The House called for a vote to deny the request for the purchase, but it failed by two votes, 59–57. The Federalists even tried to prove the land belonged to Spain, not France, but available records proved otherwise. The Federalists also feared that the power of the Atlantic seaboard states would be threatened by the new citizens in the West, whose political and economic priorities were bound to conflict with those of the merchants and bankers of New England. There was also concern that an increase in the number of slave-holding states created out of the new territory would exacerbate divisions between North and South. A group of Northern Federalists led by Senator Timothy Pickering of Massachusetts went so far as to explore the idea of a separate northern confederacy.

Another concern was whether it was proper to grant citizenship to the French, Spanish, and free black people living in New Orleans, as the treaty would dictate. Critics in Congress worried whether these "foreigners", unacquainted with democracy, could or should become citizens.

Spain protested the transfer on two grounds: First, France had previously promised in a note not to alienate Louisiana to a third party and second, France had not fulfilled the Third Treaty of San Ildefonso by having the King of Etruria recognized by all European powers. The French government replied that these objections were baseless since the promise not to alienate Louisiana was not in the treaty of San Ildefonso itself and therefore had no legal force, and the Spanish government had ordered Louisiana to be transferred in October 1802 despite knowing for months that Britain had not recognized the King of Etruria in the Treaty of Amiens.

Henry Adams claimed "The sale of Louisiana to the United States was trebly invalid; if it were French property, Bonaparte could not constitutionally alienate it without the consent of the French Chambers; if it were Spanish property, he could not alienate it at all; if Spain had a right of reclamation, his sale was worthless." The sale of course was not "worthless"—the U.S. actually did take possession. Furthermore, the Spanish prime minister had authorized the U.S. to negotiate with the French government "the acquisition of territories which may suit their interests." Spain turned the territory over to France in a ceremony in New Orleans on November 30, a month before France turned it over to American officials.

Other historians counter the above arguments regarding Jefferson's alleged hypocrisy by asserting that countries change their borders in two ways: (1) conquest, or (2) an agreement between nations, otherwise known as a treaty. The Louisiana Purchase was the latter, a treaty. The Constitution specifically grants the president the power to negotiate treaties (Art. II, Sec. 2), which is just what Jefferson did.

Madison (the "Father of the Constitution") assured Jefferson that the Louisiana Purchase was well within even the strictest interpretation of the Constitution. Treasury Secretary Albert Gallatin added that since the power to negotiate treaties was specifically granted to the president, the only way extending the country's territory by treaty could not be a presidential power would be if it were specifically excluded by the Constitution (which it was not). Jefferson, as a strict constructionist, was right to be concerned about staying within the bounds of the Constitution, but felt the power of these arguments and was willing to "acquiesce with satisfaction" if the Congress approved the treaty. The Senate quickly ratified the treaty, and the House, with equal readiness, authorized the required funding, as the Constitution specifies. The fledgling United States did not have $15 million in its treasury; it borrowed the sum from Great Britain, at an annual interest rate of six percent. The United States Senate advised and consented to ratification of the treaty with a vote of twenty-four to seven on October 20. On the following day, October 21, 1803, the Senate authorized Jefferson to take possession of the territory and establish a temporary military government. In legislation enacted on October 31, Congress made temporary provisions for local civil government to continue as it had under French and Spanish rule and authorized the President to use military forces to maintain order. Plans were also set forth for several missions to explore and chart the territory, the most famous being the Lewis and Clark Expedition.

The opposition of New England Federalists to the Louisiana Purchase was primarily economic self-interest, not any legitimate concern over constitutionality or whether France indeed owned Louisiana or was required to sell it back to Spain should it desire to dispose of the territory. The Northerners were not enthusiastic about Western farmers gaining another outlet for their crops that did not require the use of New England ports. Also, many Federalists were speculators in lands in upstate New York and New England and were hoping to sell these lands to farmers, who might go west instead, if the Louisiana Purchase went through. They also feared that this would lead to Western states being formed, which would likely be Republican, and dilute the political power of New England Federalists.

When Spain later objected to the United States purchasing Louisiana from France, Madison responded that America had first approached Spain about purchasing the property but had been told by Spain itself that America would have to treat with France for the territory.

Formal transfers and initial organization
France turned over New Orleans, the historic colonial capital, on December 20, 1803, at the Cabildo, with a flag-raising ceremony in the Plaza de Armas, now Jackson Square. Just three weeks earlier, on November 30, 1803, Spanish officials had formally conveyed the colonial lands and their administration to France.

On March 9 and 10, 1804, another ceremony, commemorated as Three Flags Day, was conducted in St. Louis, to transfer ownership of Upper Louisiana from Spain to France, and then from France to the United States. From March 10 to September 30, 1804, Upper Louisiana was supervised as a military district, under its first civil commandant, Amos Stoddard, who was appointed by the War Department.

Effective October 1, 1804, the purchased territory was organized into the Territory of Orleans (most of which would become the state of Louisiana) and the District of Louisiana, which was temporarily under control of the governor and judicial system of the Indiana Territory. The following year, the District of Louisiana was renamed the Territory of Louisiana. New Orleans was the administrative capital of the Orleans Territory, and St. Louis was the capital of the Louisiana Territory.

Financing

To pay for the land, the American government used a mix of sovereign bonds and the assumption of French debts. Earlier in 1803, Francis Baring and Company of London had become the U.S. government's official banking agent in London following the failure of Bird, Savage & Bird. Because of this favored position, the U.S. asked Barings to handle the transaction. Barings had a close relationship with Hope & Co. of Amsterdam, and the two banking houses worked together to facilitate and underwrite the purchase. Hopes brought to the transaction experience with issuing sovereign bonds and Barings brought its American connections.

Francis Baring son Alexander and Pierre Labouchère from Hopes arrived in Paris in April 1803 to assist with the negotiations. With the bankers' help, the French and American negotiators settled on a price of 80 million francs ($15 million), down from an initial price of 100 million francs, a sum the Americans could not afford and the financers could not provide. In the final agreement, the value of the U.S. currency was set at  francs per U.S. dollar. In  dollars, the $15 million purchase price is equivalent to $ million.

As part of the deal, the U.S. assumed responsibility for 20 million francs ($3.75 million) of French debts owed to U.S. citizens. The remaining 60 million francs ($11.25 million) were financed through U.S. government bonds carrying 6% interest, redeemable between 1819 and 1822. In October 1803, the U.S. Treasury had some $5.86 million in specie on hand, $2 million of which would be used to pay a portion of the debts assumed from France as part of the purchase.

Because Napoleon wanted to receive his money as quickly as possible, Barings and Hopes purchased the bonds for 52 million francs, agreeing to an initial 6 million franc payment upon issuance of the bonds followed by 23 monthly payments of 2 million francs each. The first group of bonds were issued on January 16, 1804, but the banks had already provided a 10 million franc advance to France in July 1803. In need of funds, Napoleon pressed the banks to complete their purchase of the bonds as quickly as possible, and by April 1804 the banks transferred an additional 40.35 million francs to fully discharge their obligations to France. In the end, Barings and Hopes acquired the $11.25 million in bonds for just $9.44 million.

Although the War of the Third Coalition, which brought France into a war with the United Kingdom, began before the purchase was completed, the British government initially allowed the deal to proceed as it was better for the neutral Americans to own the territory than the hostile French. However by December 1803, the British directed Barings to halt future payments to France. Barings relayed to order to Hopes, which declined to comply, allowing the final payments to be made to France in April 1804.

Boundaries
A dispute soon arose between Spain and the United States regarding the extent of Louisiana. The territory's boundaries had not been defined in the 1762 Treaty of Fontainebleau that ceded it from France to Spain, nor in the 1801 Third Treaty of San Ildefonso ceding it back to France, nor the 1803 Louisiana Purchase agreement ceding it to the United States.

The U.S. claimed that Louisiana included the entire western portion of the Mississippi River drainage basin to the crest of the Rocky Mountains and land extending to the Rio Grande and West Florida. Spain insisted that Louisiana comprised no more than the western bank of the Mississippi River and the cities of New Orleans and St. Louis. The dispute was ultimately resolved by the Adams–Onís Treaty of 1819, with the United States gaining most of what it had claimed in the west.

The relatively narrow Louisiana of New Spain had been a special province under the jurisdiction of the Captaincy General of Cuba, while the vast region to the west was in 1803 still considered part of the Commandancy General of the Provincias Internas. Louisiana had never been considered one of New Spain's internal provinces. If the territory included all the tributaries of the Mississippi on its western bank, the northern reaches of the purchase extended into the equally ill-defined British possession—Rupert's Land of British North America, now part of Canada. The purchase originally extended just beyond the 50th parallel. However, the territory north of the 49th parallel (including the Milk River and Poplar River watersheds) was ceded to the UK in exchange for parts of the Red River Basin south of 49th parallel in the Anglo-American Convention of 1818.

The eastern boundary of the Louisiana purchase was the Mississippi River, from its source to the 31st parallel, though the source of the Mississippi was, at the time, unknown. The eastern boundary below the 31st parallel was unclear. The U.S. claimed the land as far as the Perdido River, and Spain claimed that the border of its Florida Colony remained the Mississippi River. The Adams–Onís Treaty with Spain resolved the issue upon ratification in 1821. Today, the 31st parallel is the northern boundary of the western half of the Florida Panhandle, and the Perdido is the western boundary of Florida.

Because the western boundary was contested at the time of the purchase, President Jefferson immediately began to organize four missions to explore and map the new territory. All four started from the Mississippi River. The Lewis and Clark Expedition (1804) traveled up the Missouri River; the Red River Expedition (1806) explored the Red River basin; the Pike Expedition (1806) also started up the Missouri but turned south to explore the Arkansas River watershed. In addition, the Dunbar–Hunter Expedition (1804–1805) explored the Ouachita River watershed. The maps and journals of the explorers helped to define the boundaries during the negotiations leading to the Adams–Onís Treaty, which set the western boundary as follows: north up the Sabine River from the Gulf of Mexico to its intersection with the 32nd parallel, due north to the Red River, up the Red River to the 100th meridian, north to the Arkansas River, up the Arkansas River to its headwaters, due north to the 42nd parallel and due west to its previous boundary.

Slavery

Governing the Louisiana Territory was more difficult than acquiring it. Its European peoples, of ethnic French, Spanish and Mexican descent, were largely Catholic; in addition, there was a large population of enslaved Africans made up of a high proportion of recent arrivals, as Spain had continued the transatlantic slave trade. This was particularly true in the area of the present-day state of Louisiana, which also contained a large number of free people of color. Both present-day Arkansas and Missouri already had some slaveholders in the 18th and early 19th century.

During this period, south Louisiana received an influx of French-speaking refugee planters, who were permitted to bring their slaves with them, and other refugees fleeing the large slave revolt in Saint-Domingue. Many Southern slaveholders feared that acquisition of the new territory might inspire American-held slaves to follow the example of those in Saint-Domingue and revolt. They wanted the U.S. government to establish laws allowing slavery in the newly acquired territory so they could be supported in taking their slaves there to undertake new agricultural enterprises, as well as to reduce the threat of future slave rebellions.

The Louisiana Territory was broken into smaller portions for administration, and the territories passed slavery laws similar to those in the southern states but incorporating provisions from the preceding French and Spanish rule (for instance, Spain had prohibited slavery of Native Americans in 1769, but some slaves of mixed African-Native American descent were still being held in St. Louis in Upper Louisiana when the U.S. took over). In a freedom suit that went from Missouri to the U.S. Supreme Court, slavery of Native Americans was finally ended in 1836. The institutionalization of slavery under U.S. law in the Louisiana Territory contributed to the American Civil War a half century later. As states organized within the territory, the status of slavery in each state became a matter of contention in Congress, as southern states wanted slavery extended to the west, and northern states just as strongly opposed new states being admitted as "slave states." The Missouri Compromise of 1820 was a temporary solution.

Asserting U.S. possession

After the early explorations, the U.S. government sought to establish control of the region, since trade along the Mississippi and Missouri rivers was still dominated by British and French traders from Canada and allied Indians, especially the Sauk and Fox. The U.S. adapted the former Spanish facility at Fort Bellefontaine as a fur trading post near St. Louis in 1804 for business with the Sauk and Fox. In 1808 two military forts with trading factories were built, Fort Osage along the Missouri River in western present-day Missouri and Fort Madison along the Upper Mississippi River in eastern present-day Iowa. With tensions increasing with Great Britain, in 1809 Fort Bellefontaine was converted to a U.S. military fort and was used for that purpose until 1826.

During the War of 1812, Great Britain hoped to annex all or at least portions of the Louisiana Purchase should they successfully defeat the U.S. Aided by their Indian allies, the British defeated U.S. forces in the Upper Mississippi; the U.S. abandoned Forts Osage and Madison, as well as several other U.S. forts built during the war, including Fort Johnson and Fort Shelby. U.S. ownership of the whole Louisiana Purchase region was confirmed in the Treaty of Ghent (ratified in February 1815) and guaranteed on the battlefield at the decisive Battle of New Orleans when the British sent over 10,000 of the best British Army soldiers to try to take New Orleans in a 5 month long campaign starting from September 1814 (First Battle of Fort Bowyer) to February 1815 (Second Battle of Fort Bowyer). Nobody really knows what post-victory plans for New Orleans and Upper Louisiana were given by the British government to Major General Sir Edward Pakenham and his second-in-command Major General Samuel Gibbs because both generals were killed in action at the Battle of New Orleans. Pakenham was ordered to conduct the New Orleans/Mobile campaign even in the middle of the peace negotiations in late 1814. The British would have likely garrisoned New Orleans and would have occupied it for a very long time because they and their ally Spain did not recognize any treaties and land deals conducted by Napoleon since 1800, especially the Louisiana Purchase. The U.S. later built or expanded forts along the Mississippi and Missouri rivers, including adding to Fort Bellefontaine, and constructing Fort Armstrong (1816) and Fort Edwards (1816) in Illinois, Fort Crawford (1816) in Wisconsin, Fort Snelling (1819) in Minnesota, and Fort Atkinson (1819) in Nebraska.

Impact on Native Americans

The Louisiana Purchase was negotiated between France and the United States, without consulting the various Indian tribes who lived on the land and who had not ceded the land to any colonial power. The four decades following the Louisiana Purchase was an era of court decisions removing many tribes from their lands east of the Mississippi for resettlement in the new territory, culminating in the Trail of Tears.

The purchase of the Louisiana Territory led to debates over the idea of indigenous land rights that persisted into the mid 20th century. The many court cases and tribal suits in the 1930s for historical damages flowing from the Louisiana Purchase led to the Indian Claims Commission Act (ICCA) in 1946. Felix S. Cohen, Interior Department Lawyer who helped pass ICCA, is often quoted as saying, "practically all of the real estate acquired by the United States since 1776 was purchased not from Napoleon or any other emperor or czar but from its original Indian owners", roughly estimating that Indians had received twenty times as much as France had for the territory bought by the United States, "somewhat in excess of 800 million dollars". More recently, the total cost to the U.S. government of all subsequent treaties and financial settlements over the land has been estimated to be around 2.6 billion dollars.

See also
Alaska Purchase
Corps of Discovery
Florida Purchase
Foreign affairs of the Jefferson administration
Franco-American alliance
Historic regions of the United States
List of French possessions and colonies
Louisiana Purchase Historic State Park
Territorial evolution of the United States
Territories of the United States on stamps
Lewis and Clark National Historic Trail

Notes

References

, pp. 101–109.

Further reading

 Gleijeses, Piero. "Napoleon, Jefferson, and the Louisiana Purchase." International History Review 39.2 (2017): 237–255.

External links

Case and Controversies in U.S. History, Page 42 Senator Pickering explains his opposition to the Louisiana Purchase, 1803.

 
1803 in France
1803 in New France
1803 in the United States
1803 treaties
Great Plains
History of St. Louis
History of United States expansionism
Louisiana (New France)

Midwestern United States
Pre-statehood history of Arkansas
Pre-statehood history of Iowa
Pre-statehood history of Kansas
Pre-statehood history of Louisiana
Pre-statehood history of Missouri
Pre-statehood history of Montana
Pre-statehood history of Nebraska
Pre-statehood history of North Dakota
Pre-statehood history of Oklahoma
Pre-statehood history of South Dakota
Pre-statehood history of Wyoming
Treaties involving territorial changes